The 1980 Michigan State Spartans football team was an American football team that represented Michigan State University in the 1980 Big Ten Conference football season. The Spartans finished in ninth place in the Big Ten Conference (Big Ten), compiled a 3–8 overall record (2–6 against Big Ten opponents), and were outscored by their opponents by a combined total of 278 to 221. The team's .273 winning percentage was the worst in program history since the winless 1917 season. The team played its home games at Spartan Stadium in East Lansing, Michigan.

In January 1980, Michigan State hired Frank "Muddy" Waters as its new head football coach after Darryl Rogers resigned to take over as Arizona State's head coach. Waters had played for Michigan State from 1946 to 1949 and had been a head coach at Hillsdale College (1954–1973) and Saginaw Valley State (1975–1979).

The team's statistical leaders included quarterback John Leister with 1,559 passing yards, Steve Smith with 667 rushing yards, Ted Jones with 568 receiving yards, and placekicker Morten Andersen with 57 points. Punter Ray Stachowicz was selected by both the Associated Press (AP) and the United Press International (UPI) as a first-team player on the 1980 All-Big Ten Conference football team. Several Michigan State players also ranked among the Big Ten leaders in various statistical categories, including the following:
 Morten Andersen ranked third in the Big Ten with 12 field goals made and a 66.7 field goal percentage, and seventh with 56 points scored. 
 John Leister ranked fourth in the Big Ten with 247 pass attempts and 14 interceptions, and fifth with 1,559 passing yards and 1,658 total yards.
 Thomas Morris ranked second with 185 punt return yards and third with 7.1 yards per punt return.
 Steve Smith ranked fourth with nine touchdowns from scrimmage and sixth with 180 plays from scrimmage and 54 points scored.

Schedule

Personnel

Game summaries

at Illinois
On September 13, Michigan State lost to Illinois, 20–17, in Champaign, Illinois, to spoil Muddy Waters debut as the Spartans' head coach. Mike Bass kicked the game-winning field goal as time ran out.

at Oregon
On September 20, Michigan State lost to Oregon, 35–7, at Autzen Stadium in Eugene. After the game, Michigan State coach Muddy Waters said, "They just beat our face off."

Western Michigan
On September 27, Michigan State defeated Western Michigan, 33–7, before a crowd of 75,12 at Spartan Stadium in East Lansing. The victory was the first of the Muddy Waters era at Michigan State. The Spartans were assisted by five Western Michigan fumbles and two interceptions. The Spartans scored three touchdowns off Western Michigan turnovers. Michigan State tailback Tony Ellis scored three touchdowns. Morten Andersen kicked two field goals for the Spartans.

Notre Dame
On October 4, Michigan State lost to Notre Dame (ranked No. 7 in the AP Poll), 26–21. Notre Dame running back Phil Carter rushed for 254 yards in the game.

Michigan State honored former head coach Duffy Daugherty at halftime.

at Michigan
On October 11, in the annual Michigan–Michigan State football rivalry game, Michigan State lost to Michigan, 27–23, before a crowd of 105,263 at Michigan Stadium in Ann Arbor. Michigan took an early 10–0 lead, but Michigan State rallied back, aided by three Morten Andersen field goals, including a 57-yard conversion that set a Michigan State record. In the third quarter, with the score tied 13-13, Michigan State was penalized for roughing the kicker on a field goal attempt The penalty gave Michigan a first down at the nine-yard line, and three plays later John Wangler threw a touchdown pass to Anthony Carter. Stan Edwards rushed for 139 yards for Michigan. Michigan scored its final touchdown on a pass from Wangler to Craig Dunaway. Michigan intercepted a pass in the final minute-and-a-half of the game to stop the Spartans' final drive.

Wisconsin
On October 18, Michigan State lost to Wisconsin, 17–7, at Spartan Stadium in East Lansing. Wisconsin fullback Dave Mohapp rushed for 138 yards and scored a touchdown. Wisconsin's second touchdown followed a fumbled punt that was recovered in the end zone by Mark Subach.

at Purdue
On October 25, Purdue defeated Michigan State, 36–25, in West Lafayette. Purdue quarterback completed 24 of 46 passes for 340 yards to break the NCAA career record for passing yardage. Hermann passed the prior record of 7,747 yards set by Jack Thompson from 1976 to 1978. Michigan State quarterback John Leister threw more passes (54) than Hermann, but completed only 18, had five interceptions, and lost a fumble. After the game, Michigan State coach Muddy Waters said, "John is pretty disgusted with himself."

Ohio State
On November 1, Ohio State (AP No. 9) defeated Michigan State, 48–16, in front of a crowd of 77,153 persons at Spartan Stadium in East Lansing. Ohio State tallied 603 total yards in the game, and the Buckeyes' 48 points was the most allowed by Michigan State since 1976.

Northwestern
On November 8, Michigan State defeated Northwestern, 42–10, before a crowd of 60,157 at Spartan Stadium in East Lansing. Michigan State tailback Steve Smith rushed for 229 yards and a school record with four touchdowns. The Spartans totaled 571 yards of total offense.

at Minnesota
On November 15, Michigan State defeated Minnesota, 30–12, before a crowd of 30,329 in Minneapolis. Michigan State quarterback John Leister passed for 209 yards and three touchdowns. Minnesota quarterback Tim Salem completed only 5 of 15 passes, threw two interceptions, and fumbled twice.

Iowa
On November 22, Iowa shut out Michigan State, 41–0, before a disappointed crowd of 55,123 fans at Spartan Stadium in East Lansing. After the game, Iowa coach Hayden Fry called it a "real fine victory," while Michigan State coach Muddy Waters said: "You saw it – rotten, lousy flat. It was about the worst game I ever saw. We were afraid it would happen, scared to death it would happen with an inexperienced team like we have."

See also
 1980 in Michigan

References

Michigan State
Michigan State Spartans football seasons
Michigan State Spartans football